Jade Cargill (born June 3, 1992) is an American professional wrestler. She is signed to All Elite Wrestling (AEW), where she is the inaugural and current AEW TBS Champion. Her ongoing reign is the longest reign of any AEW championship at + days.

Early life 
Cargill was born in Gifford, Florida She attended Sebastian River High School and Vero Beach High School, helping her teams to two basketball district championships. Cargill is a Jacksonville University graduate with a social science degree, where she played basketball, and was named to Atlantic Sun Preseason First Team in her senior year. She also has a certified master's in child psychology.

Professional wrestling career 
In April 2019, Cargill attended a WWE tryout at the WWE Performance Center. Subsequently, she began training at A. R. Fox's WWA4 Academy. Taking advice from Mark Henry, who Cargill described as her "mentor," she went to train at Heath Miller and Richard Borger's Face 2 Face Wrestling School. She then trained at Nightmare Factory under Q. T. Marshall and Dustin Rhodes. Sonjay Dutt and Bryan Danielson started coaching her when they arrived in AEW in 2021, at the request of AEW founder and owner Tony Khan.

Cargill made her professional wrestling debut with All Elite Wrestling (AEW) on the November 11, 2020, episode of Dynamite, interrupting Cody Rhodes, and teasing the arrival of Shaquille O'Neal. The next day, Tony Khan announced that Cargill had signed a multi-year contract with AEW. She would work with Cody Rhodes and his wife Brandi, leading to a tag team match pitting the Rhodes against herself and Shaq. However, Brandi was replaced by Red Velvet. On the March 3, 2021, episode of Dynamite, Cargill and O'Neal defeated Cody and Velvet, marking the first match of Cargill's wrestling career. On the March 17 episode of Dynamite, Cargill wrestled in her first singles match, defeating Dani Jordyn. Despite Matt Hardy offering his managerial services to Cargill, he was shunned in favor of Mark Sterling, which was announced on the May 28 episode of Dynamite.

In October 2021, it was announced that she would participate in the AEW TBS Championship tournament to determine the inaugural champion, and would be one of four women to receive a first round bye. Cargill went on to defeat Red Velvet in the quarterfinals on November 24 and Thunder Rosa in the semi finals on December 29. In the finals, which took place on January 5, 2022, she defeated Ruby Soho to become the inaugural AEW TBS Champion. Two weeks later, in what were her first title defenses, she would retain against Anna Jay and Julia Hart on episodes of Rampage.

Throughout the early part of 2022, at various AEW events, Jade would continue her undefeated streak and retain her title against numerous opponents, most notably The Bunny, Tay Conti, Willow Nightingale, and Leila Grey. In mid-April, she formed her own stable called "The Baddies", which consisted of her, Kiera Hogan and Red Velvet. On May 29, at Double or Nothing, Stokely Hathaway became her new manager and a few weeks later in late-June, Grey became part of the stable, replacing an injured Velvet. Around the same time, Cargill entered her first feud with the debuting Athena. The two eventually faced off in a title match at All Out on September 4, where Jade squashed Athena in a match that lasted less than five minutes. After fending off other contenders such as Madison Rayne and Diamante, she began a feud with Nyla Rose who stole her TBS championship belt. The feud between the two lasted nearly two months and culminated at Full Gear on November 19, where Cargill defeated Rose to retain her title.

On January 5, 2023, Cargill reached the one-year mark as TBS Champion. The following week on January 13, she became the longest-reigning champion in AEW's history at 373 days, breaking Hikaru Shida's 372-day record with the AEW Women's World Championship.

Personal life 
Cargill is of Jamaican descent. She has a daughter named Bailey Quinn with her partner, former Cincinnati Reds second baseman Brandon Phillips. Cargill has credited late female wrestler Chyna and X-Men character Storm as her inspirations.

Filmography

Television

Championships and accomplishments 

 All Elite Wrestling
 AEW TBS Championship (1 time, current)
  Longest reigning champion in AEW history (+ days)
 TBS Championship Tournament (2022)
 Dynamite Award (1 time)
 Breakout Star – Female (2022)
 Pro Wrestling Illustrated
 Ranked No. 5 of the top 150 female wrestlers in the PWI Women's 150 in 2022
 Rookie of the Year (2021)
 Wrestling Observer Newsletter
 Rookie of the Year (2021)

References

External links 
 
 
 

1992 births
Living people
African-American basketball players
African-American female models
African-American female professional wrestlers
All Elite Wrestling personnel
AEW TBS Champions
American exercise instructors
American female professional wrestlers
American sportspeople of Jamaican descent
American women's basketball players
Basketball players from Florida
Cosplayers
Female models from Florida
Jacksonville University alumni
People from Vero Beach, Florida
Professional wrestlers from Florida
Sportspeople from Florida
Jacksonville Dolphins women's basketball players
21st-century African-American sportspeople
21st-century African-American women
21st-century professional wrestlers